Floris Smand (born  20 January 2003) is a Dutch footballer who plays as a centre-back for SC Cambuur.

Personal life
Smand grew up in the town of Lemmer, in the province of Friesland.

Career
Smand signed his first professional contract with Cambuur in August, 2022 to tie him to the club for 2 seasons with an option for a third. He had been with Cambuur youth teams since 2015. He made his professional debut in the Eredivisie appearing for SC Cambuur at the Cambuur Stadion in a 2-0 defeat to Excelsior Rotterdam on 6 August, 2022.

References

External links
 

Living people
2003 births
SC Cambuur players
Dutch footballers
Eredivisie players
21st-century Dutch people